The Halford Hewitt is a public schools' golf tournament held in the UK. It was first held in 1924.

References

External links

Golf tournaments in the United Kingdom
1924 establishments in the United Kingdom